Senator Lee may refer to:

Members of the United States Senate
Blair Lee I (1857–1944), U.S. Senator from Maryland from 1914 to 1917
Joshua B. Lee (1892–1967), U.S. Senator from Oklahoma 1937 to 1943
Mike Lee (born 1971), U.S. Senator from Utah since 2011
Richard Henry Lee (1732–1794), U.S. Senator from Virginia from 1789 to 1792

United States state senate members
Abby Lee (politician) (born 1970s), Idaho State Senate
Barbara Lee (born 1946), California State Senate
Blair Lee III (1916–1985), Maryland State Senate
Dorothy McCullough Lee (1901–1981), Oregon State Senate
Ezell Lee (1938–2012), Mississippi State Senate
Francis Lightfoot Lee (1734–1797), Virginia State Senate
Gary Lee (politician) (born 1947), North Dakota State Senate
Gordon Lee (congressman) (1859–1927), Georgia State Senate
Howard Nathaniel Lee (born 1934), North Carolina State Senate
Janis Lee (fl. 1990s–2010s), Kansas State Senate
John Jay Lee (born 1955), Nevada State Senate
John Lee (Maryland politician) (1788–1871), Maryland State Senate
Judy Lee (born 1942), North Dakota State Senate
Lawrence J. Lee (1932–1991), Missouri State Senate
M. Lindley Lee (1805–1876), New York State Senate
Martin Lee (New York politician), New York State Senate
Michael V. Lee (born 1968), North Carolina State Senate
Mordecai Lee (born 1948), Wisconsin State Senate
Oliver Lee (New Mexico gunfighter) (1865–1941), New Mexico State Senate
Pete Lee (born 1947), Colorado State Senate
Stephen D. Lee (1833–1908), Mississippi State Senate
Susan C. Lee (born 1954), Maryland State Senate
Tom Lee (Florida politician) (born 1962), Florida State Senate
William H. Lee (New York politician) (1876–1954), New York State Senate
William Henry Fitzhugh Lee (1837–1891), Virginia State Senate

Other
Regine Biscoe Lee (born 1981), Senate of Guam

See also
Senator Lea (disambiguation)
Senator Lees (disambiguation)